John Foley was an Irish priest who served a president of St. Patrick's, Carlow College.

Biography
He was born in 1854 at Mensal Lodge, Old Leighlin, County Carlow, to Patrick Foley and Anne Delaney. He was educated locally at Leighlinbridge National School and at Carlow College where he went on and trained for the priesthood, continuing his clerical studies from 1874 to 1881 at Maynooth College. He served as a church curate in Portlaoise, before returning to St. Patrick's College, Carlow as a professor in 1886.
In 1896 he succeeded his older brother Patrick Foley as president of the college when his brother was appointed bishop of Kildare and Leighlin. He held the position as president of the college for the remainder of his life.

Foley's nephew Michael Alphonsus Foley (the son of his brother Michael) died serving in the Leinster Regiment in Egypt in 1919.

He died on 16 September 1937 at the age of 83 and is buried in the Carlow College cemetery.

References

External links
 

1854 births
1937 deaths
20th-century Irish Roman Catholic priests
People from County Carlow
Alumni of Carlow College
Alumni of St Patrick's College, Maynooth
Burials at Carlow College Cemetery
19th-century Irish Roman Catholic priests